Year 126 (CXXVI) was a common year starting on Monday (link will display the full calendar) of the Julian calendar. At the time, it was known as the Year of the Consulship of Verus and Ambibulus (or, less frequently, year 879 Ab urbe condita). The denomination 126 for this year has been used since the early medieval period, when the Anno Domini calendar era became the prevalent method in Europe for naming years.

Events

By place

Roman Empire 
 The old Pantheon is demolished by Emperor Hadrian, and the construction of a new one begins (its date is uncertain, because Hadrian chooses not to inscribe the temple).

Asia 
 First year of the Yongjian era of the Chinese Han Dynasty.
</onlyinclude>

Births 
 August 1 – Pertinax, Roman emperor (d. 193)
 Lu Kang, Chinese politician and prefect (d. 195)

Deaths 
 Domitia Longina, Roman empress (b. c. 53 AD)
 Yan Ji (or Ansi), Chinese empress

References